The Venezuelan civil wars were a long series of conflicts that devastated the country during most of the 19th century.

Historical summary 

After independence and the subsequent dissolution of Gran Colombia, in Venezuela, there was no strong government with sufficient authority and power to guarantee order, nor an idea of a nation nor civic experience. This led to a phenomenon of caudillismo and militarism in which local political-military chiefs were able to confront and defeat the central government following their particular and ideological interests together with popular masses that supported them by feeling identified with them. Similar processes occurred throughout Hispanic America after the end of Spanish colonial rule. This was due in part to the weakening of the ruling class, the Mantuans who had already ruled the country since colonial times. During the first half of the century, the only character who managed to become a factor of relative stability was José Antonio Páez thanks to his military power and only his defeat on the battlefields ended his political career. The popular caudillo llanero rose several times against governments that he considered had violated the current legality or fought against those who tried to overthrow legitimate governments. His only rebellion against legality would have been La Cosiata, and this was a patriotic reaction against a supranational project that most Venezuelans were not interested in embarking on.

Between 1830 and 1903 there were a total of 166 armed revolts and almost fifty years of war. It is estimated at a million dead in total, 70% of them were non-combatants killed by the plagues, famines, anarchy and political repression that wars brought. Other sources lower the figure to 260,000 killed in combat, plus 62,000 due to earthquakes and pestilence, not counting those killed in the Federal War. There were only two periods in that century that the governments were stable and lasting: in 1835 to 1848 and 1870 to 1887.

The period of instability ended with the dictatorship of Juan Vicente Gómez who ruled Venezuela from 1908 until his death in 1935, thus ensuring a strong base for state power, ending the regional caudillos by passing power to the central high command of the Armed Forces of Venezuela. Due to these wars the country became impoverished and suffered a relative demographic stagnation.

These civil wars were above all combats between armed militias, each one organized by its place of origin, thus reflecting the alliances of the regional power groups with the government or the rebels at each moment. There were cases in which the inhabitants of neighboring towns or even of the same town clashed on a small scale during these civil wars. Each party sought the support of the regional caudillos, who held the real power at the time.

The economic disorganization of independence was deepened by civil wars, a long anarchy. Páez and Soublette based their economy on cocoa, typical of their region, the plains. In those years the Orientals, the Llanos and the Corianos disputed the hegemony in rapid succession. Guzmán Blanco, a man from Caracas, managed to stay in power thanks to the coffee boom, as did the Andeans Castro and Gómez.

Various guerrilla expeditions successively seized Caracas during that century, marking constant changes in the government. This process, in which regional leaders felt dissatisfied with the distribution of power in the capital, took up arms and overthrew weak central governments by taking Caracas (this has been continuously since Independence). In 1812 the Corianos of Monteverde organized an expedition to overthrow the First Republic; a year later the Andeans of Bolívar and the Orientals or Guianans of Mariño put an end to the monarchical restoration; in 1814 Boves and his llaneros destroy the Second Republic. Páez was supported by the llaneros, Falcón by the Corianos, Castro or Gómez by the Andeans, the Eastern ones to Rolando Monteverde (liberal, collaborator of Andrade and after Castro in his early days, whom he helped confront the mochista parties in Guayana, main caudillo of that region between 1899 and 1908). This continuous process is finalized by Castro. After their victory in 1899, a modern professional national army was created that is capable of subduing the militias of llaneros, barloventoños, corianos and orientales that come their way in the Liberating Revolution. Caudillismo had been temporarily placated by guzmancismo, however, after his death, it resurfaced again, which led to definitive measures being taken during the Castro government. All the caudillos agreed with or fought against each government, promoted local revolts or autonomist movements and got involved in different sides (according to their momentary interest) in the national rebellions: having loyal armies guaranteed their regional pre-eminence. Many of them called themselves defenders of federalism, understood as "maintenance of federal autonomy" and opposition to any centralization of power.

Initially, the conservatives and liberals, who marked the entire nineteenth century with their wars for power in the Andes, they sought to identify themselves with the colors of the Venezuelan flag - yellow, blue and red from top to bottom. The former, supporters of Páez, used red to differentiate themselves from the latter, supported by Caracas intellectuals, veterans frustrated at not having received land, and llaneros, who wore yellow. However, in 1867 an alliance was formed between conservatives and liberal sectors to support the revolution of José Tadeo Monagas, who had used power for personal benefit along with his brother, José Gregorio, during the previous years in which they ruled. To embody this new union, yellow and red chose the central color of the flag: blue. From the second half of the 19th century, conservatives identified themselves with the color blue, and the liberals, beginning with the supporters of the government of Juan Crisóstomo Falcón, continued to use yellow. Another point of difference was that the Liberals supported a federal system, while the Conservatives supported a centralized one. Although that was only theoretical, because in power many liberals exercised an authoritarian mandate, centered on their person, such as Antonio Guzmán Blanco, founder of Yellow Liberalism, who was also an anticlerical, supporter of economic liberalism and benefactor of the powerful who supported him to the power. In the last decades of the century, the conservatives were gradually left out of the game for power, rising to the liberals. From then on, civil wars were fought between factions of liberals, for example, some faithful to federalism and others in favor of centralism. In the country's last civil wars (1899 and 1901–1903) everyone called themselves Liberals: the caudillo José Manuel Hernández defined his party as "Nationalist Liberal"; also the dictator Castro, who defeated the "yellow liberals and the red and blue or white or tricolor liberals."

Guzmán Blanco was the dominant figure of the last decades of the nineteenth century, the subsequent weakening of his figure would be followed during the 90s of the century by a resurgence of anarchy and caudillismo. Both factors were also present in the Federal War (1859–1863) and even earlier, in the Second Republic (1813–1814), when the inability of the ruling classes to fulfill their promises and the aspirations of the common people led to extremely violent popular insurrections that devastated Venezuela. The oldest under the command of Boves and the later directed by Zamora, two caudillos who died on the way to gain power. Instead, from the fragmentation of Gran Colombia to the Federal War, the dominant figure in Venezuela was Páez, a key figure in trying to impose a stable regime in the country.

Civil wars and caudillos 
The main ones are highlighted in bold.

Revolution of the Reforms 

The federal caudillos led by Santiago Mariño rise up against the conservative government of José María Vargas with the support of José Antonio Páez in June 1835. Mariño and his followers are defeated in March 1836. The conservatives maintain power for more than a decade. New liberal rebellions, on a smaller scale, break out in June and September 1844.

Peasant insurrection of 1846 

Produced in September 1846, animated and directed by the liberal Ezequiel Zamora against the conservative president Carlos Soublette. Páez becomes the main supporter of the government and manages to pacify the country by May 1847. The power of the conservatives is weakened and an agreement must be reached so that a liberal like José Tadeo Monagas assumes power, the Monagato or Liberal Oligarchy begins (1847–1858).

Venezuelan civil war of 1848–1849 

The Páez rebellion broke out on February 4, 1848, when the caudillo raised his llaneros against the liberal government of Monagas. They are joined by Zamora and Soublette. 3000 men form a troop. Monagas sends 6,000 soldiers to confront him. Defeated in the battle of Los Araguatos (March 10), he fled to the Caribbean until gathering followers and six thousand muskets, he seized Maracaibo but his troops were defeated in Taratara (April 6), having to entrench themselves in Maracaibo. On July 2, 1849, Paez landed at La Vela de Coro and concentrated 2,000 rebels, but was defeated at the battle of Casupo on August 12, surrounded by four or five thousand government soldiers, and surrendered three days later. He is exiled, having to go into exile until 1858.

Barquisimeto Rebellion 

In August 1853 in Cumaná a thousand conservatives had risen up demanding the return of Páez, they were quickly crushed and the government decided to increase the army to 10,000 men. A new revolt in Barquisimeto broke out on July 12, 1854, under the command of Juan Bautista Rodríguez, with 3,000 men mutinying; he immediately divides them into three battalions for a combined offensive inland. Fifteen days later, Rodríguez and 1,700 soldiers are defeated near his city by 2,500 government troops. On the 28th, 1,000 rebels led by Antonio José Vásquez surrendered. The third battalion was dissolved in Portuguesa into guerrilla bands. A new rebellion of 150 soldiers broke out on the 31st in the same city, but by mid-August they had surrendered.

March Revolution 

The brothers José Tadeo and José Gregorio Monagas kept taking turns in power until March 5, 1858, when a revolt quickly led by the liberal (with the support of the conservatives) Julián Castro Contreras broke out in Valencia, soon having more than five thousand armed followers. On March 18, Castro Contreras enters Caracas, three days after the resignation of the Monagas. The alliance between Liberals and Conservatives is short-lived, triggering a new and worse conflict.

Federal War 

It was a massive insurrection that broke out on February 20, 1859, under the command of Zamora, forming an army of 3,000 rebels (guerrillas will be the majority of war actions and only two major battles). He wins in Santa Inés on December 10, 1859 (2,500 rebels defeat 3,200 government, suffering 200 and 800 casualties respectively). His army grew to 7,000 men with the help of Juan Antonio Sotillo, but he was assassinated on the following January 10 and succeeded by Juan Crisóstomo Falcón (many rebels deserted). The liberal army includes 3,000 veteran eastern llaneros. The liberals are defeated in Coplé (February 17, 1860) by León de Febres Cordero and 5,000 soldiers, moving to a stage of guerrilla warfare that plunges the country into deep anarchy. This conflict was the bloodiest of all those experienced, between 20,000 and 100,000 people died. The Treaty of Coche on May 23, 1863, put an end to the war with the victory of Falcón. After the fall of Guanare (April 5, 1863), the conservatives had no way to resist. The liberals controlled Coro, Maracaibo, Barquisimeto and Guayana, with two armies (4,000 seats in the Venezuelan west and 3,000 in the southwest).

La Genuina 

In September 1867, General Luciano Mendoza rose in Bolívar against Falcón, dissatisfied with that government. In December, Generals Miguel Antonio Rojas do it in Aragua and Pedro Arana in Carabobo. Falcón sends Generals Pedro Manuel Rojas to the southeast and José Loreto Arismendi and José Eusebio Acosta to the east. Manuel Ezequiel Bruzual is in charge of the General Staff. The rebels under the command of General Natividad Mendoza are defeated on Cerro La Esperanza, in Petare, by the government generals Justo Valles and Vidal Rebolledo. The rebels are forced to limit themselves to guerrilla activity. On October 16, Blanco Guzmán negotiated a peace agreement with Mendoza. Two days later the pardon was delivered.

Blue Revolution 

After years of political tension, on December 12, 1867, José Tadeo Monagas and the reconquistadores or blue rebels (disgruntled liberals and conservatives) rose up against the Falcón government. They add up to 4,000 soldiers from Guárico, Carabobo and Aragua. These, under the command of Miguel Antonio Rojas, are defeated twelve days later near the capital. The blue movement had begun with autonomous and uncoordinated uprisings. On April 25, 1868, Falcón had to resign, but this did not satisfy the Blues. On May 6 they face each other in Las Adjuntas and four days later in Monte Caballería. The interim government of Manuel Ezequiel Bruzual tries to negotiate, but Monagas concentrates 4,000 soldiers around the capital. Between July 22 and 25, 3,300 blues attacked Caracas, defended by 2,300 government officials. More than 1,000 combatants on both sides are killed. On June 26, 1868, Monagas entered Caracas. Monagas appoints Guillermo Tell Villegas as interim president. Bruzual fled to La Guaira and then to Puerto Cabello, Monagas with 3000 seats besieged him for ten days until the capitulation on August 14, Bruzual dying in the fighting. He then sends Rojas to pacify the west.

April Revolution 

Also called the Yellow Revolution, it happened on August 14, 1869, when the yellow liberal Antonio Guzmán Blanco tried to seek support to confront the Monagas government and was attacked by the army. He must take refuge among the foreign delegations and go into exile. The rebellion broke out after two years of political anarchy during the Monagas government. His Liberal-Conservative coalition had fractured as the Conservatives began to concentrate power. Guzmán Blanco disembarks in Curamichate, near La Vela de Coro, on February 14, 1870. He had assembled 52 ships in Curaçao, bringing material to quickly arm an army of 18,000 rebels. On April 27, after three days of fighting, Guzmán Blanco and six to eight thousand rebels entered Caracas (the city had only 1,600–2,000 defenders, most of them armed neighbors). Guzmán Blanco marches with 6,000 soldiers on Apure, pacifying it at the beginning of 1871 and assuring his power. The long period of Yellow Liberalism begins.

Coro Revolution 

The Revolution of Coro or Colinada begins in October 1874, the rebels are commanded by General León Colina but by the following February they were defeated. In the east stands General José Ignacio Pulido Briceño. Guzmán Blanco must leave power a few years later in favor of his opponents.

Revindicating Revolution 

Francisco Linares Alcántara initiates a government very opposed to Guzmancism, but he is assassinated on November 30, 1878. On January 3, 1879 Guzmán Blanco rises up against his successor José Gregorio Valera. Quickly the bulk of the Venezuelan army deserts, more than 10,000 soldiers join the former dictator while only 3,000 remain loyal to the president. The rebel divided his army into three forces and sent General José Gregorio Cedeño with 2,300 soldiers to La Victoria, where the decisive battle took place on February 6. More than 2,000 combatants die and barely 300 loyal to Valera remain capable of fighting. On February 13, Cedeño enters Caracas. Guzmán Blanco remained in power until his death in 1888.

Legalist Revolution 

Guzmán Blanco is succeeded by his lieutenants with the continuing governments. On March 11, 1892, the liberal Joaquín Crespo rebelled with his llaneros in Guárico. The government of Raimundo Andueza Palacio sends General Sebastián Casañas with 4,000 men to suffocate the movement, focusing the fight on Táchira, where Governor Cipriano Castro joins the rebels. After some initial victories, the government forces begin to fall back in the west until the decisive defeat at Táriba (14–15 May), allowing the rebels Castro and Juan Vicente Gómez to enter Mérida at the head of 3,000 soldiers. After this success, Crespo went from mobilizing small batches to important contingents throughout the country. On June 17, Andueza Palacio resigned from the presidency and Tell Villegas remained as interim. On July 1, in La Cortada del Guayabo, two armies of five thousand combatants each face each other. Nine thousand rebels assault Villa de Cura on August 9. After a new defeat in Los Colorados, on October 4, the government left the capital. Crespo approaches with 10,000 soldiers and on October 6 enters Caracas victorious.

Queipa Revolution 

In 1897 Crespo organized an electoral fraud to ensure the victory of his supporter, Ignacio Andrade. The defeated candidate and leader José Manuel Hernández rises up on March 17, 1898. The rebels of Hernández and Luis Lima Loreto add up to 700 combatants but they defeat former president Crespo and 1,500 seats in Mata Carmelara, in Cojedes, on April 16. Crespo dies in combat. The rebel army quickly grows to 16,000 fighters, while the government has 20,000, including loyalist warlord militias. The Minister of War, Antonio Fernández, is also defeated on June 5. Finally, Andrade entrusts Ramón Guerra with the campaign. This forces Hernández to capitulate on June 12 in El Hacha, in Yaracuy.

Restorative Liberal Revolution 

Venezuelans exiled in Colombia under the command of Cipriano Castro return to their country in an expedition on May 23, 1899. Like the famous Admirable Campaign in 1813, the forces of the rebels or restorers or tachirenses grow as they enter the center Venezuelan Andean to overthrow the unpopular Andrade government. Initially Castro and 57 companions, soon numbering 700, defeated 5,000 government troops at Paso Yegüines and entered Mérida. On September 12, with 2,000 troops, he defeated 4,000 or 4,600 government positions in Tocuyito commanded by the Minister of War, General Diego Bautista Ferrer, who lost 2,000 men trying to assault the enemy positions. Two days later Andrade assumes personal command of the war and Castro launches a coordinated offensive against Caracas. After this, several warlords and their militias deserted to the rebel side: Leopoldo Baptista with 3,000 followers and Luciano Mendoza with 4,500. On October 20, Andrade was overthrown in a coup and forced into exile in Curaçao. With 10,000 soldiers, Castro enters the capital on October 23 with the generals and caudillos Luciano Mendoza (yellow liberal), Samuel Acosta and Luis Lima Loreto (liberal nationalists or "mochistas", that is, faithful to the caudillo José Manuel "Mocho" Hernández).

Liberating Revolution 

Initially, on July 26, 1901, an army of 1,000 exiles and 5,000 Colombians under the command of Carlos Rangel Garbiras tried to return to their country, but they were defeated in San Cristóbal. Faced with Castro's measures, which sought to centralize political and military power, various caudillos rose up, initially in isolated pockets, but later in a great revolt led by the banker Manuel Antonio Matos, who had spent months forming an opposition coalition with politicians and military, and supported by foreign companies with interests in the country. The first to rebel was Governor Mendoza de Aragua on December 19. Castro sent Gómez against Mendoza, facing each other in San Mateo and Villa de Cura on December 21 and 22 respectively. Mendoza is defeated and persecuted. On February 7 there is a great rebellion. The Mochistas were in revolt in the center and west of the country, the Yellows in the east, and the Ciudad Bolívar garrison had risen up led by Nicolás Rolando. After the decisive battle of La Victoria (October 12, 1902) the rebels begin to be subdued, the powerful army of 12,000 to 16,000 combatants that they had concentrated suffers 3,000 casualties. Castro barely had 6,000 soldiers. It is the last civil war in the country and ends on July 21, 1903, after three days of siege, when the Rolandist troops surrender in Ciudad Bolívar. Cipriano Castro seized absolute power until he was overthrown by Juan Vicente Gómez in 1908.

References

Bibliography 

 Dixon, Jeffrey S. & Meredith Reid Sarkees (2015). A Guide to Intra-state Wars: An Examination of Civil, Regional, and Intercommunal Wars, 1816–2014. CQ Press. .
 Esteves González, Edgar (2006). Las Guerras de Los Caudillos. Caracas: El Nacional. .
 Guarda Rolando, Inés (2005). "La acción política de los caudillos venezolanos de finales del siglo XIX: un ejército prágmatico". En Domingo Irwin G. & Frédérique Langue, coordinación. Militares y poder en Venezuela: ensayos históricos vinculados con las relaciones civiles y militares venezolanas. Caracas: Universidad Católica Andrés Bello. .
 Quintero Montiel, Inés Mercedes (1989). El ocaso de una estirpe: la centralización restauradora y el fin de los caudillos históricos. Caracas: Editorial Alfadil. .

Civil Wars
Civil wars involving the states and peoples of South America